Humane Sagar  also transliterated as "Human Sagar", is an Indian playback singer who works mostly in Ollywood Industry. He has won the reality singing competition "Voice of Odisha Season 2" in 2012.

Early life
His family has a musical background. His father and mother were singers. His grandfather was a composer for private albums. He later joined as a participant in a reality TV show called "Voice of Odisha" on Tarang TV in 2012 and won the show.

Career
He got his break through Tarang Cine Productions in the feature film Ishq Tu Hi Tu where he sang the title track composed by Abhijit Majumdar which became a hit. After that he has sung hundreds of Odia movie songs. He has also made a Hindi Album "Mera Yeh Jahan". He has worked in various Odia music albums like "Tuma Otha Tale", 'Niswasa', 'Bekhudee', and 'Chehera' in 2017.

Political career
Sagar joined politics for Biju Janata Dal (BJD), a political party of the Indian state of Odisha on 3 March 2019.

Personal life
Humane Sagar married Shriya Mishra in 2017, his fellow participant in the show Voice of Odisha Season 2. They have a daughter.

Discography

Album

Singles

As Playback Singer

References 

Living people
Odia playback singers
Cinema of Odisha
1988 births